Ewigkeit is the musical project of English artist James Fogarty aka Mr. Fog from Brighton. Having released five studio albums, on 28 March 2007, Fogarty announced the end of the project on Blabbermouth, the Death To Music website and also on Myspace but revived it in 2012.

Band history
The purpose of this one-man project was to try and forge a unique musical sound. After the release of the first album, Battle Furies on a short-lived Neat Records subsidiary called Eldethorn, Fogarty gave his entire music collection away to an Oxfam charity shop so that he would be free of influences creating his next work. Starscape was received well by the extreme music press, but label folded and the project was put on hiatus. During the missing years, Ewigkeit concentrated on his other black metal project The Meads of Asphodel and his collaboration with Jimmy Cauty on the multi-media project Blacksmoke. In 2003 Land of Fog, was eventually released on Metal Age Productions. Fogarty himself regarded this as the first Ewigkeit album, and it gained him enough attention to get his project signed to Earache Records, on which Radio Ixtlan was released in 2004, to considerable acclaim.

Released in 2005, Conspiritus (mixed by John Fryer), a conceptual album examining conspiracy theories, has been hailed by many as "marking a maturation of Ewigkeit's eclectic sound". Also in 2005, a music video was made in collaboration with film-maker Anthony Gates for the track "Its Not Reality". In 2006, Ewigkeit made a live video recording entitled Ewigkeit - Live From A Bunker, which displayed the project in a live setting acting as a free "online" gig - the 25 minute set (filmed in a Nuclear Bunker in the vicinity of Brighton, England) was uploaded to Google video. Also recorded was a free download MP3 EP, Return to the Land of Fog.

In December 2006, Fogerty burned all his recording contracts. All previous Ewigkeit material was then made available at Deathtomusic.com. In January 2007, Death to Music Productions gave away a remastered and superior version of Battle Furies. In March 2007, Starscape was available free, with the intention that all material will be fully released online.

In March 2007, James Fogarty abandoned the Ewigkeit project, stating in the press-release, "... [metal] is mostly out-of-date, out-of-touch with its origins and (worst of all) conservative in the extreme..."

An online link to Fogerty's new project, The Bombs of Enduring Freedom, was created with the debut self-titled album released in December 2007, and an EP Kalashikovs and Car Bombs, followed in 2008. During this time, he also produced the Old Forest album Tales of the Sussex Weald.

In 2012 Ewigkeit was reactivated, with a black metal sound, and two more studio albums were released: Back to Beyond in August 2012, and Cosmic Man (July 2017). A new EP, Depopulate, will be released on January, 23, 2021.

Etymology
Ewigkeit was the name given to this music project when Fogerty found the word in the English Concise Oxford Dictionary. A little known "imported" word, hardly used in the English language at all, Ewigkeit means 'eternity' in German. He has been known in interviews to say that in retrospect, it was the worst name he could have chosen.

Discography
 Dwellers On The Threshold (demo), 1996 (Self-released)
 Battle Furies, 1997 (Eldethorn)
 Starscape, 1999 (Eldethorn)
 Land Of Fog, 2003 (Metal Age Productions)
 Radio Ixtlan, 2004 (Earache)
 Conspiritus, 2005 (Earache)
 Back to Beyond, 2013 (Death to Music Productions)
 Cosmic Man, 2017 (Svart)
 Battle Furies 2.017, 2017 (Death to Music Productions)
 DISClose, 2019 (Death to Music Productions)

Ewigkeit has appeared on various compilation albums, notably:
Metal Hammer covermount Earache Sampler CD (2004)
Black Light Magazine CD sampler
No Holy Additives vol. 2,3 & 4
Metal Age Productions sampler CD
Britannia Infernus
Metal: A Headbangers Companion

References

External links
 Earache Records
 Myspace Page
 The Bombs of Enduring Freedom

English black metal musical groups
Music and politics
British experimental musical groups
Earache Records artists
Musical groups established in 1995